Phoma tracheiphila is a fungal plant pathogen. It causes a disease known as Mal secco on citrus trees. It occurs in dry, cool climates such as the Mediterranean, Black Sea and Asia Minor. It forms pycniospores that are carried short distances by rain, or by wind to new leaves, where germinated hyphae invade stomata or more likely fresh wounds.

See also
 List of citrus diseases

References

External links 
 Index Fungorum
 USDA ARS Fungal Database

Fungi described in 1948
Fungal citrus diseases
tracheiphila